UEFA Euro 2020 was an international football tournament held across eleven cities in Europe from 11 June to 11 July 2021. The 24 national teams involved in the tournament were required to register a squad of up to 26 players – of which three had to be goalkeepers – by 1 June 2021, 23:59 CEST (UTC+2), ten days prior to the opening match of the tournament. Only players in these squads were eligible to take part in the tournament.

In the event that a player on the submitted squad list suffered from an injury or illness prior to his team's first match of the tournament, that player could be replaced, provided that the team doctor and a doctor from the UEFA Medical Committee both confirmed that the injury or illness was severe enough to prevent the player from participating in the tournament. Should a goalkeeper have suffered from an injury or illness after his team's first match of the tournament, he could still be replaced, even if the other goalkeepers from the squad were still available. A player who had been replaced on the player list could not be readmitted to the list.

The position listed for each player is per the official squad lists published by UEFA. The age listed for each player is their age as of 11 June 2021, the first day of the tournament. The numbers of caps and goals listed for each player do not include any matches played after the start of the tournament. The club listed is the club for which the player last played a competitive match prior to the tournament. The nationality for each club reflects the national association (not the league) to which the club is affiliated. A flag is included for coaches who are of a different nationality to their team.

Expansion of squad sizes
At the start of April 2021, UEFA stated they were considering allowing tournament squads to be expanded from the usual 23 players, used at every European Championship since 2004, following calls from national team managers in case of a possible COVID-19 outbreak in a team, as well as to reduce player fatigue caused by the fixture congestion of the prior season. On 27 April, it was reported that the UEFA National Team Competitions Committee had approved the expansion of squads to 26 players, subject to confirmation by the UEFA Executive Committee.

On 4 May 2021, the Executive Committee confirmed the use of 26-player squads. However, teams still could only name a maximum of 23 players on the match sheet for each tournament fixture (of which 12 were substitutes), in line with the Laws of the Game.

COVID-19 protocol
Players who either tested positive for SARS-CoV-2 or had been declared as "close contacts" of a positive SARS-CoV-2 tested person – and therefore were put in isolation by the decision of health authorities – were considered cases of serious illness and could therefore be replaced before the first match.

If a group of players of a team were placed into mandatory quarantine or self-isolation prior to a match following a decision from national or local health officials due to positive SARS-CoV-2 tests, and fewer than 13 players were available (including at least one goalkeeper), additional players could have been called up to meet the minimum of 13 players required. In such a case, an equivalent number of quarantined players must have been definitively withdrawn from the 26-player list.

Any player who had been replaced on the player list after the submission deadline of 1 June 2021 could not be readmitted to the list.

Group A

Italy
Manager: Roberto Mancini

Italy announced a 33-man preliminary squad on 17 May 2021. The squad was extended to 34 players on 25 May, then reduced to 28 players on 30 May (with two players added and eight removed). The final squad was announced on 2 June. Stefano Sensi withdrew injured and was replaced by Matteo Pessina on 7 June. Lorenzo Pellegrini withdrew injured and was replaced by Gaetano Castrovilli on 10 June.

Switzerland
Manager: Vladimir Petković

Switzerland announced a 29-man preliminary squad on 19 May 2021. The final squad was announced on 31 May. After the team's first match, goalkeeper Jonas Omlin withdrew injured and was replaced by Gregor Kobel on 13 June.

Turkey
Manager: Şenol Güneş

Turkey announced a 30-man preliminary squad on 14 May 2021. The final squad was announced on 1 June.

Wales
Manager: Rob Page

Wales announced on 23 April 2021 that Rob Page would act as manager for the tournament, after regular manager Ryan Giggs was charged by the Crown Prosecution Service. The team announced a 28-man preliminary squad on 24 May. The final squad was announced on 30 May. James Lawrence withdrew injured and was replaced by Tom Lockyer on 31 May.

Group B

Belgium
Manager:  Roberto Martínez

Belgium announced their final squad on 17 May 2021. Timothy Castagne left the squad on 15 June due to injury. After the team's round of 16 match, goalkeeper Simon Mignolet withdrew injured and was replaced by Thomas Kaminski on 28 June.

Denmark
Manager: Kasper Hjulmand

Denmark announced their final squad on 25 May 2021.

Finland
Manager: Markku Kanerva

Finland announced a 26-man preliminary squad on 19 May 2021. The squad was extended to 28 players on 23 May, and further extended to 29 players on 25 May. The final squad was announced on 1 June. Sauli Väisänen withdrew injured and was replaced by Niko Hämäläinen on 3 June.

Russia
Manager: Stanislav Cherchesov

Russia announced a 30-man preliminary squad on 11 May 2021. The final squad was announced on 2 June. Andrei Mostovoy withdrew after testing positive for SARS-CoV-2 and was replaced by Roman Yevgenyev on 11 June. Yuri Zhirkov left the squad on 15 June due to injury.

Group C

Austria
Manager:  Franco Foda

Austria announced a 30-man preliminary squad on 19 May 2021. The final squad was announced on 24 May.

Netherlands
Manager: Frank de Boer

The Netherlands announced a 34-man preliminary squad on 14 May 2021. The final squad was announced on 26 May. Jasper Cillessen withdrew after testing positive for SARS-CoV-2 and was replaced by Marco Bizot on 1 June. Donny van de Beek withdrew injured on 8 June and was not replaced, thus reducing the squad to 25 players.

North Macedonia
Manager: Igor Angelovski

North Macedonia announced their final squad on 20 May 2021.

Ukraine
Manager: Andriy Shevchenko

Ukraine announced a 35-man preliminary squad on 30 April 2021. The squad was extended to 36 players on 1 May, then reduced to 34 players on 15 May as Oleksandr Andriyevskyi and Volodymyr Shepelyev withdrew injured. The squad was further reduced to 33 players on 20 May as Vitaliy Buyalskyi withdrew injured, then extended to 34 players on 26 May. The squad was further reduced to 32 players on 28 May as Yevhen Konoplyanka and Viktor Kovalenko withdrew injured. The final squad was announced on 1 June.

Group D

Croatia
Manager: Zlatko Dalić

Croatia announced their final squad on 17 May 2021.

Czech Republic
Manager: Jaroslav Šilhavý

The Czech Republic announced 25 players of their final squad on 25 May 2021. Michal Sadílek was announced as the final player in the squad on 27 May, after the confirmation of Ondřej Kúdela's ten-match ban. Jiří Pavlenka withdrew injured and was replaced by Tomáš Koubek on 12 June.

England
Manager: Gareth Southgate

England announced a 33-man preliminary squad on 25 May 2021. Mason Greenwood withdrew injured on 1 June, with the final squad announced later that day. Trent Alexander-Arnold withdrew injured on 3 June and was replaced by Ben White on 7 June. After the team's first match, goalkeeper Dean Henderson withdrew injured and was replaced by Aaron Ramsdale on 15 June.

Scotland
Manager: Steve Clarke

Scotland announced their final squad on 19 May 2021.

Group E

Poland
Manager:  Paulo Sousa

Poland announced their final squad on 17 May 2021. Arkadiusz Milik withdrew injured on 7 June and was not replaced, thus reducing the squad to 25 players.

Slovakia
Manager: Štefan Tarkovič

Slovakia announced a 24-man preliminary squad on 18 May 2021. The final squad was announced on 2 June.

Spain
Manager: Luis Enrique

Spain announced their final squad, containing 24 players rather than the allowed 26, on 24 May 2021. With the omission of Sergio Ramos, there were no Real Madrid players in the Spain squad for the first time in a major tournament. Sergio Busquets tested positive for SARS-CoV-2 on 6 June, and was isolated while remaining in the squad.

Sweden
Manager: Janne Andersson

Sweden announced their final squad on 18 May 2021. Martin Olsson withdrew injured and was replaced by Pierre Bengtsson on 31 May. Dejan Kulusevski and Mattias Svanberg tested positive for SARS-CoV-2 on 8 June, and were isolated while remaining in the squad.

Group F

France
Manager: Didier Deschamps

France announced their final squad on 18 May 2021.

Germany
Manager: Joachim Löw

Germany announced their final squad on 19 May 2021.

Hungary
Manager:  Marco Rossi

Hungary announced a 30-man preliminary squad on 6 May 2021. The squad was reduced to 29 players on 23 May as Szilveszter Hangya withdrew injured. Dominik Szoboszlai withdrew injured on 1 June, with the final squad announced later that day. Dániel Gazdag left the squad on 16 June due to injury.

Portugal
Manager: Fernando Santos

Portugal announced their final squad on 20 May 2021. João Cancelo withdrew after testing positive for SARS-CoV-2 and was replaced by Diogo Dalot on 13 June.

Player representation

By age

Outfield players
Oldest:  Pepe
Youngest:  Kacper Kozłowski

Goalkeepers
Oldest:  Maarten Stekelenburg
Youngest:  Anatoliy Trubin

Captains
Oldest:  Goran Pandev
Youngest:  Andrew Robertson

By club

By club nationality

The above table is the same when it comes to league representation, with only the following exceptions:
 The English league system had 153 representatives, including six players from Wales-based Cardiff City and Swansea City.
 The American league system had 7 representatives, including one player from Canada-based CF Montréal.

No national team had all its players from the nation's club teams. Every national team also had at least one player from a club of its nation, though Wales had no players from its league system.

References

External links

Squads
2020